The Gordon Dam, also known as the Gordon River Dam, is a major gated double curvature concrete arch dam with a controlled spillway across the Gordon River, located in Southwest National Park, Tasmania, Australia. The impounded reservoir is called Lake Gordon.

The dam was constructed in 1974 by the Hydro Electric Corporation (TAS) for the purpose of generating hydro-electric power via the conventional Gordon Power Station located below the dam wall.

Features and location
At 100% capacity the dam wall holds back  of water; making Lake Gordon the largest lake in Australia. The single controlled spillway is capable of discharging .

Approximately 48 arch dams have been built in Australia and only nine have double curvature. Gordon Dam is almost twice the height of the next highest arch dam, Tumut Pondage.

Power station

The first two turbines were commissioned in 1978, before the third was commissioned a decade later in 1988.

The power station is fueled by water from Lake Gordon.

History 
In 1963, the Australian Government provided an 5 million grant to Tasmania's Hydro-Electric Commission to build the Gordon River Road from Maydena into the Gordon River area in the South West Wilderness region. Construction was underway by 1964, and within three years, the Tasmanian State Parliament approved the Gordon River Power Development with little in house opposition in 1967. Power operation began in 1978, a third generator was added in 1988.

The completed Gordon Dam was the only dam built on the Gordon River, despite the support of Tasmanian politicians such as Eric Reece, Robin Gray, and others to build the Franklin Dam further downstream.  The construction of Gordon Dam resulted in some flooding of the connected Lake Pedder as planned.  Subsequent opposition to restore Lake Pedder failed after a Parliamentary inquiry in 1995.

The dam was designed with Dr. Sergio Guidici as the chief engineer. He went on to be involved with the design of the Crotty Dam in the West Coast Range, one of the last significant dams created by Hydro Tasmania during its unabated dam-building era.

The dam is connected with the Gordon River Power Station,  under the surface of the switch yard.

In 2015, the Perth-based YouTube channel How Ridiculous broke the world record for the world's highest basketball shot at Gordon dam, though this record has since been surpassed by How Ridiculous themselves twice over.

2015–2016 Tasmanian energy crisis 
Due to an extreme drought in 2015 and the untimely failure of the related Basslink power feed, electricity production needs had drained the lake to its minimum operating level in March 2016. The water level fell 45 metres to a record low of six per cent capacity. Pictures document the dramatic effect. After repair of Basslink and record rainfalls, Lake Gordon levels had recovered to -28 metres by January 2017.

Engineering heritage award 
The dam is listed as a National Engineering Landmark by Engineers Australia as part of its Engineering Heritage Recognition Program.

See also 

 Franklin-Gordon Wild Rivers National Park
 List of power stations in Tasmania
 Southwest National Park

References 

Dams completed in 1978
Arch dams
Hydro Tasmania dams
Gordon River power development scheme
Recipients of Engineers Australia engineering heritage markers